Amphicnaeia sexnotata is a species of beetle in the family Cerambycidae. It was described by Melzer in 1933.

References

sexnotata
Beetles described in 1933